Huldange is a small town in the commune of Troisvierges, in far northern Luxembourg.  , the town has a population of 353.  Nearby is the source of the Clerve.

Towns in Luxembourg
Troisvierges